Tóka þáttr Tókasonar is a short legendary saga found in the Flateyjarbók.

Sources and external links
Cultural Paternity in the Flateyjarbók Óláfs saga Tryggvasonar, by Elizabeth Ashman Rowe.
The Tale of Toki Tokason, translated by Peter Tunstall.
The story in Old Norse at heimskringla.no.
The story in Old Norse at Snerpa.

Legendary sagas
Þættir